No Baek-rin (hangul: 노백린, hanja: 盧伯麟) was an Imperial Korean army officer, and independence activist.

Life 
No was born on 15 February 1875 in Hwanghae Province. He studied traditional Korean studies. His father believed that his traits as soldier, showing up from his young age, would make him a great general later. In 1895, No was selected as one of the state sponsored students sent to Japan, and was sponsored by Ministry of Interior Park Yung-hyo. He entered the Keio University, and after graduating, he entered the Imperial Japanese Army Academy in 1898. After his graduation of the academy, he was deployed to 1st Brigade, and 3rd Brigade as an apprentice officer.

In June 1900, No returned to Korea after his education in Japan. After his return to Korea, No was commissioned as Junior Lieutenant. In April 1901, No became an instructor of the Military Academy of Korean Empire with the support of Min Young-hwan. He took an effort to educate the officers of the growing generation. On 4 December 1905, No was appointed an instructor of the Army College of Korean Empire.

As a nationalist officer, he despised the traitors of Korea attempting to assist Japan to annex Korea. In March 1906, No was invited to a party by Itō Hirobumi, which invited many Korean prominent officials, including pro-Japanese politicians like Song Byeong-jun and Ye Wanyong. In that party, he insulted Ye Wanyong by calling him like a dog. Hasegawa Yoshimichi was furious about No that he put out his sword. No also responded Hasegawa with by putting his sword out. Ito needed to mediate the two.

No also actively participated in the Nationalist Enlightenment movement. He supported Daehan Gurakbu, and Daehan Heung hak hui. He participated in the establishment of New People's Association too.

After the dissolve of the Imperial Korean army in 1907, No was commissioned as the Director of Education Section of Ministry of Military as the Imperial Korean Army college was also dissolved. On May 20, 1908, he retired from the army as Colonel. After his retirement, No joined Daehan Industry Association with other former army officers. When Korea was annexed by Japan, No started his reclusion.

The Imperial Japanese government attempted to appease No but, he refused any position offered by Japan. In 1914, No showed his desire to refuge and start independence movement to his family. In 1916, No exiled to Shanghai, and went to Hawaii.

After the March 1st Movement, No was appointed as minster of military of Provisional Government of the Republic of Korea. Before joining the government in Shanghai, No established an aviation academy in America. In February 1921, No arrived at Shanghai. In 1922, No became the prime minister of the Provisional Government, but resigned the position in April 1924. Under the Yi Dong-nyeong cabinet, No was appointed as Minister of Military. No died in January 1926 because of his kidney problem. Before his death, he enjoyed wearing his uniform of Imperial Korean Army, and dreamed entering Namdaemun with his horse.

The Korean government posthumously awarded Order of Merit for National Foundation 1st class in 1962.

Award 

 Order of the Palgwae 6th Class on 29 May 1904

 Order of the Rising Sun 6th Class

References 

1875 births
1926 deaths
Imperial Korean military personnel
Korean independence activists
Korean politicians